Deputy Commandant Rahul Mathur is a serving CRPF officer of 2008 Batch UPSC who was awarded with Kirti Chakra by President of India Ram Nath Kovind

Career 
Mathur joined the CRPF as Assistant Commandant and trained at CRPF Academy in Gurgaon. He has also served in CRPF Valley QAT.

References 

Indian police officers
Living people
Year of birth missing (living people)